The House of Hungarian Wines was a wine shop in Budapest, near the Buda Castle.

History 
This was one of the largest wine houses of the country.
The entry fee enabled one unlimited sampling for two hours.  The House had over 700 wines on display from Hungary’s 22 wine regions. The visitors could try another Hungaricum, the pálinka (different types of fruit spirits) specialities also. It was possible to taste a collection of handmade cheeses.
During the wine tasting one could get acquainted with the history, type of wine regions and international and local grape selections.
The House of Hungarian Wines is closed as of 2016.

References

External links
 Official site

Tourist attractions in Budapest
Tourism in Hungary
Wine retailers
Food and drink companies of Hungary